The 1986 Kentucky Wildcats football team represented the University of Kentucky in the Southeastern Conference (SEC) during the 1986 NCAA Division I-A football season.  In their fifth season under head coach Jerry Claiborne, the Wildcats compiled a 5–5–1 record (2–4 against SEC opponents), finished in a tie for seventh place in the SEC, and outscored their opponents, 228 to 206.  The team played its home games in Commonwealth Stadium in Lexington, Kentucky.

The team's statistical leaders included Bill Ransdell with 1,610 passing yards, Ivy Joe Hunter with 621 rushing yards, and Cornell Burbage with 331 receiving yards. This season was the last time Kentucky defeated Florida until 2018 and the last win over Florida at home until 2021.

Schedule

References

Kentucky
Kentucky Wildcats football seasons
Kentucky Wildcats football